Anna Goodman may refer to:

 Anna Goodman (musician), songwriter known for collaborating with Ben Folds
 Anna Goodman (skier), Canadian Olympic skier
 Anna Goodman Hertzberg, American clubwoman